is a Japanese original net animation (ONA) anime series based on the 1980s Japanese manga series Ghost in the Shell by Masamune Shirow, set in the Stand Alone Complex sub-continuity.

The first season premiered exclusively on Netflix worldwide on April 23, 2020. It received generally negative reviews, with critics considering it inferior to previous Ghost in the Shell media due to multiple factors. A second season was released on May 23, 2022.

Premise
In the year 2045 (11 years after events of Solid State Society), after an economic disaster known as the Simultaneous Global Default which destroyed the value of all forms of paper and electronic currency, the "Big 4" nations of the world are engaged in a state of never-ending "Sustainable War" to keep the economy going. In this world, Motoko, Batou, and other members of Public Security Section 9 have contracted themselves out as mercenaries under the group "GHOST," using their cybernetic enhancements and battle experience to earn a living while defusing hot-spots across the globe. However, the emergence of "Post Humans" and a conspiracy uncovered by former Chief Aramaki force Section 9 to reunite.

Voice cast

Production

Kodansha and Production I.G announced on April 7, 2017 that Kenji Kamiyama and Shinji Aramaki would be co-directing a new Ghost in the Shell anime production. On December 7, 2018, it was reported by Netflix that they had acquired the worldwide streaming rights to the original net animation (ONA) anime series, titled Ghost in the Shell: SAC_2045, and that it would premiere on April 23, 2020. The series is in 3DCG and Sola Digital Arts collaborated with Production I.G on the project. Ilya Kuvshinov handled character designs. An English dub was not available until May 3 due to the COVID-19 pandemic causing production delays for its recording. It was stated that the series will have two seasons of 12 episodes each, with the second set released on May 23, 2022.

In July 2021, it was announced that the first season would be adapted into a compilation film, subtitled "Sustainable War", which premiered on November 12, 2021. Netflix released the film worldwide on May 9, 2022.

Reception
The first season of the anime received generally negative reviews from critics, garnering a 14% approval rating on review aggregator Rotten Tomatoes. 

Max Genecov of Polygon wrote that the series had "none of the visceral aesthetics or mood that made Ghost in the Shell an indelible element of how we think about our interconnected lives." Writing for The A.V. Club, Toussaint Egan rated the series a C−, calling the action sequences "awful" and opining that "as wonderful as it is to return to this series’ interpretations of Major Kusanagi and company after more than a decade away, you'd be better off dusting off Stand Alone Complex DVDs and give this one a pass." Kayla Cobb of Decider wrote "time and time again SAC_2045 ignores the deeper path and chooses instead point and drool." Theron Martin of Anime News Network wrote that the series was "easily the weakest entry in the franchise so far, even below Ghost in the Shell 2: Innocence".

References

External links
 Ghost in the Shell: SAC_2045 official website 
 

2020 anime ONAs
Anime series based on manga
Articles with underscores in the title
Cyberpunk anime and manga
Ghost in the Shell
Japanese computer-animated television series
Japanese-language Netflix original programming
Netflix original anime
Production I.G
Sola Digital Arts